Huating Temple is a Buddhist temple located in Xishan District of Kunming, Yunnan, China.

History

Yuan dynasty
The temple was first established by Xuantong Yuanfeng in 1320, during the mid-Yuan dynasty (1271–1368). The construction was completed in 1334. In 1339, Xuantong Yuanfeng brought a set of Chinese Buddhist canon to the temple after he visited Jiangnan. At that time it initially called "Yuanjue Temple".

Ming dynasty
In 1441, Emperor Yingzong of the Ming dynasty (1368–1644) renamed it "Huating Temple". This name has been used to date. In 1453, Emperor Yingzong sent a eunuch named Li Yi to renovate and redecorate the temple.

After the fall of the Ming dynasty, Huating Temple was devastated by wars.

Qing dynasty
In 1687, during the reign of Kangxi Emperor (1662–1722) of the Qing dynasty (1644–1911), the provincial governor of Yunnan Wang Jiwen rebuilt the temple.

In 1857, in the Xianfeng era (1851–1861), Part of the temple was badly damaged in the Hui Uprising.

Huating Temple was restored in 1883 with a small-scale.

Republic of China
In 1920, Military Governor of Yunnan Tang Jiyao invited Hsu Yun to disseminate Buddhism. Hsu Yun supervised the reconstruction of Huating Temple.

People's Republic of China
In 1969, the Buddhist Texts Library became dilapidated for neglect. It was demolished in the following year.

Huating Temple has been designated as a National Key Buddhist Temple in Han Chinese Area by the State Council of China in 1983.

Architecture

Along the central axis are the Four Heavenly Kings Hall, Mahavira Hall, Guanyin Hall and Buddhist Texts Library. There are over 10 halls and rooms on both sides, including Guru Hall, Abbot Hall, Monastic Dining Hall, Monastic Reception Hall and Meditation Hall.

Four Heavenly Kings Hall
Statues of lion and elephant stands in front of the Four Heavenly Kings Hall. On both sides of the hall there are the statues of Heng and Ha. In the center of the hall enshrines the statues of Maitreya Buddha and Skanda. Statues of Four Heavenly Kings are enshrined in the left and right side of the hall.

Mahavira Hall
The Mahavira Hall enshrining the statues of Sakyamuni, Amitabha and Bhaisajyaguru. In front of Sakyamuni stand Ananda and Kassapa Buddha on the left and right. At the back of Sakyamuni's statue are statues of Guanyin and Twenty-four Gods of Heaven. Totally 500 niches with small statues of Arhats are carved on both sides of the bounding walls.

References

Buddhist temples in Yunnan
Buildings and structures in Kunming
Tourist attractions in Kunming
14th-century establishments in China
14th-century Buddhist temples
1334 establishments in Asia